Statistics of League of Ireland in the 1956/1957 season.

Overview
It was contested by 12 teams, and Shamrock Rovers won the championship and qualified to play in the European Cup for next season.

Final classification

Cork Hibernians were elected to the league for next season.

Results

Top scorers

Ireland
League of Ireland seasons
1956–57 in Republic of Ireland association football